Carltheo Zeitschel also Carl Theo, (13 March 1893 – allegedly 1945), was a German physician, diplomat, Nazi functionary and SS-major (1940).

Instrumental in the Holocaust in France, Zeitschel served as adviser on Jewish affairs (Judenreferent) to the German Embassy in Paris and as such was one of the organisers of the deportations of Jews from occupied France during World War II. Condemned in absentia to forced labour in perpetuity by a French court in 1954, he was killed during the bombing of Berlin in 1945.

Early life and education 
Born on 13 March 1893 Carltheo Zeitschel was the son of pharmacy owner, Franz Zeitschel, and his wife, Ella van Hees. From 1911, he studied medicine at the University of Freiburg and from 1914 to 1917, during World War I, served as an assistant doctor in the rear area military hospital of Freiburg. He graduated in 1918.

Interwar period
At the end of World War I Zeitscel was discharged from military service. From 1919 to 1920, he was a member of the Freikorps Reinhard in Berlin, working at the same time as medical assistant at Klinikum im Friedrichshain, the oldest hospital in Berlin. Later, as a full-fledged doctor, he served at various sanatoria in the Black Forest.

Zeitschel, a staunch anti-Semite, joined the Nazi party in very early times (1923).
For a decade (1925–35) he found employment as a naval surgeon.
In 1935 he came to be employed at Section II – Propaganda and  Section VII -  British India and the Far East in the Propaganda Ministry; he served also in the colonial policy department at the Nazi party headquarter.

Towards the end of 1937 he moved to the Foreign Ministry (Auswärtiges Amt or AA), even before Hitler's reshuffle of the Government with the appointment of Joachim von Ribbentrop as foreign minister on 4 February 1938. There he served as legation councillor in the political department.
For a brief period in June 1939 he was the German consul in the British colony of  Nigeria.

He was a member of the SS holding the rank of major while in Paris (1940),. More precisely, Ray states that he was operating in the military Secret Field Police.

World War II
When the Germans invaded Poland on 1 September 1939, Zeitschel was commanded to Warsaw where he dealt in looting politically valuable documents and art treasures from diplomatic missions of enemy as well neutral states.
In 1940 Zeitschel followed the ‘’Sonderkommando Künsberg’’ in its move to the western front.

In June, with Ribbentrop's authorization, Zeitschel was brought to the German Embassy in Paris by the ambassador Otto Abetz.

First he worked in the Foreign Office liaison desk to the military commander of France. He was then tasked by ambassador Abetz in looting and then closing the foreign missions in Paris, as well as in plundering Jewish art collections and galleries, and ferrying the booty "to the custody of the German embassy".

Desk officer for Jewish Affairs
From September 1940, he was promoted as commissioner for Jewish affairs and Masonic affairs liaison with the commander of the state police and the SD (Security Office) and was parallel to his career in the diplomatic service for Sturmbannführer. On 5 September 1941, he and Dannecker led the opening in Paris of the exhibition Le Juif et la France (The Jew and France).

As Judenreferent, he was one of the forces behind of the Final Solution in France, the deportation and murder of Jews.

The participation of the German Ambassador in the Jewish measures was necessary, both in unoccupied France with the Vichy government as well as in occupied France. In a document submitted in the Eichmann trial, the close cooperation between the German intelligence service (Sicherheitsdienst, or SD) in France, with the German embassy comes up with the BdS Helmut Knochen, and Theodor Dannecker as its representative in Paris on the one hand, and on the other hand expressed (Ernst Achenbach, later FDP foreign policy and almost German-EEC Commissioner, takes part here):In August 1941, Zeitschel put pressure on Abetz, so this is "personally" the commitment caught by Heinrich Himmler, "that the Jews present in the concentration camp can be deported to the East, once this permit transport" and then put the pressure on Dannecker.

Zeitschel was informed in top secret processes and knew about the Wannsee Conference of 20 January 1942. He applied the minutes of the proceedings from junior state secretary Ernst Woermann to the deportation of French Jews.

In the Nuremberg trials a letter by Zeitschel from 5 February 1946 was read:The Independent Commission of Historians - Foreign Office presented in the book Das Amt 2010, in response to the book clear that the role of the Embassy in Paris and the Foreign Office has been underestimated in driving the Holocaust in France so far. Zeitschel gave Abetz to late summer of 1941 in which he proposed a memorandum on the way to Berlin.
 make destruction or sterilization of the European Jews, with the aim that they lose about 33 v. H. their becoming rare by these measures.

In Berlin, Abetz met this Memorandum with Ribbentrop and Hitler, immediately before Hitler's decision to deport Jews from Germany.

In Tunis
Zeitschel and Rudolf Rahn arrived almost simultaneously at the Tunis bridgehead on 13 November 1942. Rahn was a representative of the Federal Foreign Office of the Afrika Korps from 15 November 1942 to 10 May 1943. He left the bridgehead after Rommel's defeat and the Axis surrender in the Tunisian Campaign in May 1943.
In Tunisia the Einsatzkommando of Walter Rauff began on 24 November 1942. On 6 December 1942, Rauff agreed in a meeting with the General Walther Nehring and Rahn, on the use of Jewish forced laborers and instituted a system of labor camps, organized by Theo Saevecke. Vichy France, Italy and the leadership of the Afrika Korps, between which the "zbV envoy" had to convey to Rahn, that the demands of the SS men were rejected in his own words, because otherwise it would have affected Tunisia and Italian Jews.

Paris Embassy
Until July 1944 Zeitschel was back at the German Embassy in Paris. He also worked out a project for the reorganization of the Paris police in the service of the occupier. After the dissolution of the Embassy in Paris, he was on 1 August 1944, at the headquarters of the SS Oberabschnitts Spree, whose director was Obergruppenführer August Heissmeyer.

Death and posthumous sentencing
Zeitschel was allegedly killed in 1945 in a bomb attack in Berlin. The French judiciary sentenced him in 1954 in absentia for his crimes to lifelong forced labor.

During the trial of Abetz, and in the much later judicial proceedings concerning the Jews deported from France, Zeitschel's name was mentioned repeatedly by the defendants and their witnesses to make a main culprit responsible.

Sources
 
 
 
 
 
 
 
 

(in German)

Notes

References

German diplomats
20th-century Freikorps personnel
1893 births
1945 deaths
Nazi Party members
Reich Security Main Office personnel
SS personnel
Holocaust perpetrators in France
Holocaust perpetrators in Tunisia
German Army personnel of World War I
German civilians killed in World War II
Deaths by airstrike during World War II
Carltheo